The College of New Caledonia (CNC) is a post-secondary educational institution that serves the residents of the Central Interior of British Columbia. This region has a population of about 145,000, and it encompasses three school districts: #28 (Quesnel), #57 (Prince George), and #91 (Nechako Lakes). CNC operates six campuses in Prince George, Burns Lake, Fort St. James, Mackenzie, Quesnel and Vanderhoof.

CNC offers small class sizes, not in excess of 37 students, as mandated by their faculty agreement.

CNC has an approximate annual system-wide enrollment of 5,000 students in health sciences, trades, university studies, career access and continuing education.

History
The college was established in Prince George, British Columbia, Canada in 1969 as a successor to the B.C. Vocational School. The college was called "New Caledonia," a name given to the region by the early explorer, Simon Fraser. The first convocation of 37 graduates took place in 1971. CNC has since expanded by opening up campuses across central British Columbia.

The College of New Caledonia's Arms, Supporters, Flag and Badge were registered with the Canadian Heraldic Authority on June 4, 1996.

Campuses

Prince George

CNC in Prince George occupies four buildings: the main campus, Technical Education Centre, Nicholson campus, and the John A. Brink Trades & Technology Centre. The Prince George campus's recreation department provides a full-size gym, weight room, bouldering wall, squash courts, and yoga classes. These services are free to attending students. The Prince George campus is also the headquarters of the CNC Students' Union.

CNC's Dental Assisting and Dental Hygiene programs are accredited by The Commission on Dental Accreditation of Canada. As of 2014, graduates of both programs have had a 100% pass rate on the National Dental Assisting Examining Board exam.

Quesnel
The Quesnel campus is located at 100 Campus Way, Quesnel, B.C. In 2011, construction began on an additional building meant to provide trades and technical training services. The completed building was officially named the West Fraser Tech Centre in 2013. The building, designed by Office of McFarlane Biggar Architects and Designers (omb), earned the Governor General's Award for Architecture in 2012, and is home to about 250 trades students in programs such as machinist/millwright, carpentry, electrical, plumbing and power engineering.

Lakes District
CNC's Lakes District campus in Burns Lake has offered a variety of community-focused educational programs since 1976. The campus has gained worldwide attention for its work in the area of Fetal Alcohol Spectrum Disorder.

Mackenzie
The college operates a campus in Mackenzie offering academic, vocational, professional development, and general interest courses and programs. They also operate the Mackenzie WorkBC Employment Services Centre in partnership with the government of British Columbia.

Nechako
The Nechako region is served by campuses in Fort St. James and Vanderhoof.

Partnerships
Credits can be transferred to University of British Columbia, Simon Fraser University, University of Victoria, Thompson Rivers University, University of Northern British Columbia, and Royal Roads University toward a four-year degree.

The College of New Caledonia and the Emily Carr University of Art and Design have created a Fine Arts program. Students can take basic first year courses at the CNC campus in Prince George, then transfer to the Emily Carr campus in Vancouver for the final three years.

Gallery

See also
List of institutes and colleges in British Columbia
List of universities in British Columbia
Higher education in British Columbia
Education in Canada
New Caledonia (Canada)

References

External links

Official website
CNC Students' Union

Colleges in British Columbia
Educational institutions established in 1969
Education in Prince George, British Columbia
1969 establishments in British Columbia